The End is the thirteenth and final novel in the children's novel series A Series of Unfortunate Events by Lemony Snicket. The book was released on Friday, October 13, 2006.

Plot 
The book begins with the Baudelaire orphans and Count Olaf on a boat heading away from the burning Hotel Denouement. After a storm, the Baudelaires arrive and are welcomed on an island by a young girl named Friday. Count Olaf, however, is not welcomed due to his snobby attitude and death threat to Friday.

Later, the pregnant Kit Snicket (who first appeared in The Grim Grotto) and a friendly snake known as the "incredibly deadly viper (a misnomer)" (which first appeared in The Reptile Room) are shipwrecked on the island. Count Olaf disguises himself as Kit, but for the first time in the series, it fails to convince anybody. The Islanders, led by a man called Ishmael (who, multiple times, says that "he won't force them" to do what he wants), capture him and shun the Baudelaires for possessing forbidden items.

That night, two of the islanders sneak out to feed the children, asking them to join a mutiny. Agreeing, the Baudelaires go to the arboretum to collect weapons, where they discover a hidden room with a book that chronicles the history of the island. Ishmael arrives, explaining to the children that their parents were once the island's leaders and were responsible for many improvements in island life, but were eventually overthrown by Ishmael, who brought the island back to a simple and austere way of life while hoarding comforts for himself.

The Baudelaires and Ishmael go back to the other side of the island, where the mutiny is already underway. Ishmael harpoons Olaf in the stomach, inadvertently shattering the helmet containing the Medusoid Mycelium, a deadly fungus, infecting the island's entire population. The Baudelaires run back to the arboretum to find horseradish, a cure for the fungus. While reading through the book left by their parents to find where the horseradish is hidden, the three continue to be affected by the fungus and, after some deliberation, accept their deaths. They eventually find that the cure is in the hybridized apples on a tree in the arboretum. They gather apples for the other islanders, only to discover that the island people have abandoned the mutiny and boarded their outrigger canoe, preparing to leave the island. Ishmael promises that he will save the islanders by sailing to a horseradish factory, but refuses to give them the apples, despite having already consumed one himself. The Baudelaires manage to toss an apple to Friday before the canoe departs.

At this point, Kit is about to go into labor. Though she is succumbing to the fungus, she cannot eat the bitter apple due to its unhealthy effects on unborn babies. When the dying Olaf hears that she is still alive, he uses his last effort to get her safely down onto the beach, where he kisses Kit and dies soon after.

The Baudelaires help Kit give birth to a baby girl. Kit then dies after requesting that the orphans name the baby after their mother Beatrice. The Baudelaires spend the next year taking care of Kit's daughter, occasionally visiting the graves of Kit and Olaf.

After reading an entry from the history book written by their parents, the Baudelaires decide to leave the island with Beatrice in order to honor their parents' wishes. Despite their fears about the outside world, the children prepare a boat and supplies for their journey back to the mainland and Beatrice says her first word, which is "Beatrice".

Reception
With sales of over 2 million copies in the United States, The End was the bestselling children's book of 2006 according to Publishers Weekly, who also reported 3 million sales of the previous 12 books in the series in the same year.

Translations
  .
 .
 .
 .
 Norwegian: Slutten, Tor Edvin Dahl, Cappelen Damm, 2007, 
 Polish : "Koniec końców" ("At Long Last", literally: "The End of Ends")
 Thai: "จุดจบ (แห่งความโชคร้าย)", Nanmeebooks Teen, 2007,

Adaptation
The book was adapted as the seventh and final episode of the third season of the television series adaptation produced by Netflix; the final book is adapted into a single episode. In this version, there is no rebellion against Ishmael's rule and the children's parents left of their own volition. The television series also ends with a young Beatrice II, Kit's daughter, recounting their subsequent undocumented adventures to Lemony Snicket, a plot point implied to have occurred in The Beatrice Letters.

References 

2006 American novels
Books in A Series of Unfortunate Events
American children's novels
HarperCollins books
Castaways in fiction
Sequel novels
2006 children's books
American novels adapted into television shows
Novels set on fictional islands